Nomada fabriciana  is a Palearctic species of nomad bee.

References

External links
Images representing  Nomada fabriciana  

Hymenoptera of Europe
Nomadinae
Insects described in 1767
Taxa named by Carl Linnaeus